Willow Wood is an unincorporated community in western Windsor Township, Lawrence County, Ohio, United States, along Symmes Creek.  It has a post office with the ZIP code 45696.

Education
Children in the Willow Wood area attend the Symmes Valley Multilevel and High Schools.

Willow Wood has a public library, a branch of Briggs Lawrence County Public Library.

References

Unincorporated communities in Lawrence County, Ohio
Unincorporated communities in Ohio